Slavers is an adventure module for the Dungeons & Dragons roleplaying game.

Plot summary

Publication history
The 128-page book was published by Wizards of the Coast in 2000 for second edition Advanced Dungeons & Dragons rules.  The adventure is a sequel to the Scourge of the Slave Lords series (modules A1 - A4), being set in the World of Greyhawk campaign setting ten years after the events described in the earlier adventures.

Slavers was written by Sean K. Reynolds and Chris Pramas. The module's cover art is by Jeff Easley, with interior art by Wayne Reynolds, David Roach and Sam Wood. Slavers is designed for five to eight characters of levels 4 - 5.

Reception
The reviewer from Pyramid noted that Slavers is full of references to the old Scourge of the Slave Lords series, including locations, events and NPCs, "making it a lot more enjoyable for fans of the classic modules".

See also
Slave Lords

References

Reynolds, Sean K, and Chris Pramas. Slavers (TSR, 2000).

External links
Slavers at the TSR Archive

Greyhawk modules
Role-playing game supplements introduced in 2000